Allama Iqbal Town is a housing complex in Pakistan built for victims of  severe floods in July 2010. It is situated on the N-70 National Highway near Muzaffargarh. It contains 296 houses, a masjid, a school, a town hall, a commercial market and six plots for recreational parks.

History
After the flood that killed nearly 2,000 people and affected at least 20 million Pakistanis in 2010, a Turkish Non-governmental organization Kimse Yok, built a small housing complex on a 110-decare area near Muzaffargarh at a cost of  Rs  550 million. Constructed in 18 months, the village was inaugurated on September 14, 2013.

References

Populated places in Muzaffargarh District